Weird Heroes, subtitled  "New American Pulp", was an American  series of  novels and anthologies produced by Byron Preiss in the 1970s that dealt with new heroic characters inspired by  pulp magazine characters.  

The series was 'packaged' by Byron Preiss Visual Productions and was published by Pyramid/Jove/HBJ.  Four of the books are anthologies, four are novels. During the same time, Preiss also produced the Fiction Illustrated series with the same publisher.

Unfortunately, most of the characters were never seen after the demise of Weird Heroes.  Preiss did write one novel about his character Guts, and planned a second.  This was published by Ace Books, maybe as part of a 'revival' of the concept as single novels.  Tor Books reprinted Philip José Farmer's Greatheart Silver stories in a single volume with new art and Reaves's character Kamus appeared in two books by other publishers. Ron Goulart's "Quest of the Gypsy" was meant to be a series of novels but only two have been published.

The first volume was reprinted by iBooks, but no word if further books will be reprinted as iBooks went gone bankrupt following Preiss's death.

Series 
 
 Weird Heroes #1
 Greatheart Silver in the Showdown at Shootout, Philip José Farmer
 Quest of the Gypsy, Ron Goulart
 Adam Stalker:  The Darkstar File, Archie Goodwin
 Rose in the Sunshine State, Joann Kobin
 Guts, the Cosmic Greaser, Byron Preiss
 Weird Heroes #2
 Doc Phoenix, Ted White
 Cordwainer Bird in "The New York Review of Bird", Harlan Ellison
 The Camden Kid, Charlie Swift
 Viva, Steve Engelhart
 Na and the Dredspore of Gruaga, graphic tale written and illustrated by Alex Niño
 SPV 166, The Underground Express, Elliot S. Maggin
 The Return of Greatheart Silver, Philip José Farmer
 Weird Heroes #3:  Quest of the Gypsy, Ron Goulart
 Weird Heroes #4:  Nightshade:  Terror, Inc., Tappan King & Beth Meacham
 Weird Heroes #5:  Doc Phoenix:  The Oz Encounter, Marv Wolfman/Ted White
 Weird Heroes #6
 Shinbet Investigates, Ron Goulart
 Orion, Ben Bova
 50 Years of Heroes:  The Edmond Hamilton Papers, Edmond Hamilton
 Greatheart Silver in the First Command, Philip José Farmer
 Galactic Gumshoe: a Franklin Davis Thriller, Arthur Byron Cover
 Weird Heroes #7: Quest of the Gypsy: Eye of the Vulture, Ron Goulart
 Weird Heroes #8
 Seward:  The Deep Fix, Michael Moorcock
 Kamus:  The Big Spell, J. Michael Reaves
 Orion 2:  Flood Tide, Ben Bova
 Kamus 2:  The Maltese Vulcan, Reaves
 Robeson:  The Grant-Robeson Papers "Savage Shadow", Maxwell Grant (Philip Jose Farmer)

Reprints and follow ons

I, Alien (Michael Reaves) Ace Books, 1979.
Guts (Byron Preiss)  Ace Books, 1979.
Produced by BPVP for Ace.  Illustrated like WH was, in many ways a continuation of WH.  "Guts" first appeared in WH#1.  A second Guts book and a second `I--Alien' book ('I--Alien in NY') were promised, but not published.
Darkworld Detective (J. Michael Reaves) Bantam Books, 1982.
Reprints first 2 Kamus stories from WH#8 plus 2 `new' ones.
Kamus of Kadizhar: The Black Hole of Carcosa (John Shirley) St Martin's, 1988.
contains character from WH#8.
Greatheart Silver (Philip José Farmer)  Tor Books, 1982.
reprints GHS stories from WH
Orion (Ben Bova)
Dragonworld (Byron Preiss and J. Michael Reaves, art by Joseph Zucker)  Bantam Books, 1979.
Actually planned as fifth "Fiction Illustrated" work.
Oz Encounter Marv Wolfman, based on an idea by Ted White, Hungry Tiger Press, 
 hardback reprint of the Doc Phoenix novel

Characters in pulp fiction